Tīrthika ("ford-maker," meaning one who is attempting to cross the stream of saṃsāra) in Indian philosophy is a general term referring to non-Buddhists in general.

In the Tipitaka, the term titthiya may refer specifically to adherents of Jainism. Whereas a Buddhist takes refuge in the Three Jewels and treads the Middle Way between extremes, a titthiya does not. According to the Asoka Avadhana, the titthiyas that were jealous of Asoka's preaching of Buddhism gathered together and said to each other, "Should this king Asoka continue a worshipper of Buddha, all other persons encouraged by him would likewise become followers of Buddha." They then went to people's houses and declared that their religion is the true religion and that Buddhism gives no moksha.

Tīrthika is associated with the Jain term tirthankara "ford-maker".

See also
 Samaññaphala Sutta
Six Heretical Teachers

Notes

Buddhist philosophical concepts
Heresy in Buddhism